Patrick Yetman (born November 17, 1980) is a Canadian former professional ice hockey player.

Playing career
Born in St. John's, Newfoundland, Patrick played junior level hockey for Cape Breton Screaming Eagles of the QMJHL in 1998–99, transferring to Moncton Wildcats for the 1999–2000 and 2000–01 seasons. He was not drafted by the NHL, and turned professional with the Augusta Lynx of the ECHL at the end of the 2000–01 season, playing some games with Kansas City Blades as well. He played the full 2000–01 ECHL season with Augusta, but played some games with Springfield Falcons of the AHL, and a playoff game with the Hartford Wolf Pack. The next season was mixed between Hartford, Augusta and Dayton Bombers.

In 2003, Patrick moved to Europe to play two seasons with ESV Kaufbeuren. Before the 2005-06 season he signed with the Storhamar Dragons and became an immediate hit. He scored 46 goals in 50 regular season and playoff games in the Norwegian GET-ligaen. He was also named the player of the month by the website Eurohockey.net for January 2006. In 2006, he returned to North America and played four games with the Manitoba Moose before returning to Europe to play with Pelicans of the Finnish SM-Liga. In 2007–08, Patrick joined Modo Hockey in Sweden. Due to Swedish tax rules he was loaned out to the Storhamar Dragons where he played 11 games and scored 16 points before joining Modo. He returned to Storhamar again the following season on a similar deal but was limited to only eight games due to injuries before he re-joined Modo.

Career statistics

References

External links
 

1980 births
Living people
Ässät players
Augusta Lynx players
Canadian ice hockey right wingers
Cape Breton Screaming Eagles players
Dayton Bombers players
Hartford Wolf Pack players
Ice hockey people from Newfoundland and Labrador
Kansas City Blades players
ESV Kaufbeuren players
Linköping HC players
Manitoba Moose players
Modo Hockey players
Moncton Wildcats players
Örebro HK players
Lahti Pelicans players
Södertälje SK players
Sportspeople from St. John's, Newfoundland and Labrador
Springfield Falcons players
Storhamar Dragons players
VIK Västerås HK players
Canadian expatriate ice hockey players in Norway
Canadian expatriate ice hockey players in Finland
Canadian expatriate ice hockey players in Sweden